Thomas Cullen may refer to:

People
 Thomas H. Cullen (1868–1944), US Representative from New York
 Thomas P. Cullen (c. 1907–1968), New York assemblyman
 Thomas Stephen Cullen (1868–1953), Canadian gynecologist associated with Johns Hopkins Hospital
 Thomas R. Cullen (1904–1984), Canadian politician from Prince Edward Island
 Thomas T. Cullen (born 1977), American federal judge from Virginia
 Thomas Cullen (Medal of Honor) (1839–1913), Irish soldier who fought in the American Civil War
 Gordon Cullen (Thomas Gordon Cullen, 1914–1994), British architect and urban designer
 Tom Cullen (born 1985), British actor
 Tomás Cullen, interim Governor of Santa Fe, Argentina, in the 19th century
 Tom Cullen (cricketer) (born 1992), English cricketer
 Tom Cullen (Irish republican) (died 1926)

Characters
Tom Cullen, a character from The Stand
Tom Cullen, a character from All Mine to Give

See also
Cullen (disambiguation)